Sarah Lindley Crease (1826–1922) was a Canadian artist.

Born in England, as the daughter of botanist John Lindley, Crease studied art with Charles Fox and Sarah Ann Drake. Her early works were botanical illustrations for her father's publications, such as The Gardener's Chronicle. She emigrated to Vancouver Island in 1859, where her husband, Henry Pering Pellew Crease, became a prominent Supreme Court Judge. Besides her seven children, Crease taught Sunday school in the Anglican church and was a volunteer and fundraiser for many local cultural institutions. She was a talented amateur as a painter and is noted for her many watercolours of the Hudson's Bay Company fort, the city of Victoria, British Columbia, and other British Columbia locales. In her later life glaucoma limited her ability to paint. Her body of work comprises a "detailed pictorial record of colonial British Columbia". Her fonds is in BC Archives, Royal BC Museum, part of Series MS-2879 - the Crease family collection.

References

Bibliography 
 

1826 births
1922 deaths
Canadian women painters
19th-century Canadian painters
20th-century Canadian painters
20th-century Canadian women artists
19th-century Canadian women artists
English emigrants to pre-Confederation British Columbia